John Stonor may refer to:
 John Stonor (judge)
 John Stonor (bishop)